Bowers Field  is a county-owned, public-use airport in Kittitas County, Washington, United States. It is located two nautical miles (4 km) north of the central business district of Ellensburg, Washington. This airport is included in the National Plan of Integrated Airport Systems for 2011–2015, which categorized it as a general aviation facility.

History
The airfield was established in 1943 as Ellensburg Army Airfield and manned by the 302d Base Headquarters and Air Base Squadron. Though planned as a fighter airfield for Fourth Air Force, it was taken over by Air Technical Service Command as a maintenance and supply depot, supporting transient Lend-Lease aircraft being flown to Alaska for subsequent transfer to the Soviet Union.

Military use ended in February 1945, and the airfield was turned over to War Assets Administration for subsequent transfer to Kittitas County for development into a civil airport.

Bowers Field is named in honor of Ensign Keith Bowers, the first man from Kittitas County killed in World War II. Bowers was at Pearl Harbor when it was attacked by the Japanese on December 7, 1941. The field became a training base for military pilots during the war.

Established in 1975, Central Washington University's aviation program is the only fully accredited public university aviation program in the Pacific Northwest. More than 90 percent of the takeoffs and landings at Bowers Field are tied to Central Washington University's aviation program. Central Washington University took over hangar space and some fixed-base functions at Bowers Field last year. At the beginning of fall quarter, Central Washington University began hiring its own flight instructors, and started leasing and purchasing its own planes. The school earned its pilot school certification from the Federal Aviation Administration.

Today, large numbers of former aircraft dispersal areas are still maintained, along with an extensive system of taxiways with what appear to be modern aircraft shelters.

Facilities and aircraft 

Bowers Field covers an area of 1,032 acres (418 ha) at an elevation of 1,764 feet (538 m) above mean sea level. It has one runways: 11/29 is 4,301 by 150 feet (1,311 x 46 m) with a concrete surface.  The former runway 7/25 was 5,590 by 150 feet (1,704 x 46 m) with an asphalt surface, but was permanently closed in June 2018.

For the 12-month period ending May 30, 2012, the airport had 60,445 aircraft operations, an average of 165 per day: 97% general aviation, 3% air taxi, and <1% military.
At that time there were 48 aircraft based at this airport: 90% single-engine, 8% multi-engine, and 2% glider.

See also 

 Washington World War II Army Airfields

References 
Sources
 
 Shaw, Frederick J. (2004), Locating Air Force Base Sites History's Legacy, Air Force History and Museums Program, United States Air Force, Washington DC, 2004.
Notes

External links 
 Bowers Field (ELN) at WSDOT Airport Directory
 Aerial image as of June 2000 from USGS The National Map
 

Airports in Washington (state)
Transportation buildings and structures in Kittitas County, Washington
Airfields of the United States Army Air Forces Technical Service Command
Airfields of the United States Army Air Forces in Washington (state)
World War II airfields in the United States
History of Washington (state)